The following scientific events occurred or are scheduled to occur in 2023.

Events

January
3 January – Researchers report molecular mechanisms that appear to underlie some of the reported health benefits of periods of intermittent fasting: changes to gene expression or rhythmicity of ~80% of  genes in at least one tissue.

4 January – Metascientists introduce the 'CD index' intended to characterize "how papers and patents change networks of citations in science and technology" and report that it has declined, which they interpret as "slowing rates of disruption". They propose linking this to changes  which they interpret as "contemporary discovery and invention" being informed by "a narrower scope of existing knowledge". The overall number of papers has risen while the total of "highly disruptive" papers hasn't. The 1998 discovery of the accelerating expansion of the universe has a CD index of 0. Their results also suggest scientists and inventors "may be struggling to keep up with the pace of knowledge expansion".
5 January
Scientists report the discovery of an unknown thin membrane meningeal layer in brain anatomy, the SLYM, that likely plays a role in CSF functions and is both  that monitor the brain for infection and inflammation.
Archaeologists report that notational signs from ~37,000 years ago in caves, apparently conveying calendaric meaning about the behaviour of animal species drawn next to them, are the first known (proto-)writing in history.
Progress in climate change mitigation implementation research:
A paywalled meta-analysis reports "required technology-level investment shifts for climate-relevant infrastructure until 2035" within the EU, which it finds to be "most drastic for power plants, electricity grids and rail infrastructure", ~87€ billion above the planned budgets and in need of sustainable finance policies.
A study (12 Jan) suggests that applying the principle of extended producer responsibility to fossil fuels could deconflict energy security and climate policy at an affordable cost, in particular authors suggest the responsibility could be used to establish the financing of  storage and nature-based solutions.
A study (30 Jan) in Nature Sustainability outlines a plan for aviation decarbonization by 2050 with moderate demand growth, continuous efficiency improvements, new short-haul engines, higher SAF production and CO2 removal to compensate for non-CO2 forcing. With constant air transport demand and aircraft efficiency, decarbonizing aviation would require nearly five times the 2019 worldwide biofuel production, competing with other hard-to-decarbonize sectors, and 0.2 to 3.4 Gt of CO2 removal to compensate for non-CO2 forcing. Carbon offsets would be preferred if carbon credits are less expensive than SAFs, but they may be unreliable, while specific routing could avoid contrails. As of 2023, fuel represents 20-30% of the airlines’ operating costs, while SAF is 2–4 times more expensive than fossil jet fuel. Projected cost decreases of green hydrogen and carbon capture could make synthetic fuels more affordable, and lower feedstock costs and higher conversion efficiencies would help FT and HEFA biofuels. Policy incentives like cleaner aviation fuel tax credits and low-carbon fuel standards could induce improvements, and carbon pricing could render SAFs more competitive, accelerating their deployment and reducing their costs through learning and economies of scale.

6 January
An international collaboration shows that hidden marine heatwaves, associated with ocean eddies that modulate undersea internal waves, threaten coastal ecosystems by driving unexpected sub-surface heating and severe coral bleaching and mortality across depths.
News outlets report on a brief meta-analysis (21 Dec 22) that confirms gas stoves are a major risk factor for asthma and updates effect-size estimates, finding around one in eight cases in the U.S. could be attributed to these.
9 January
A study suggests logged and structurally degraded (South Asian) tropical forests are carbon sources for at least a decade – even when recovering – due to larger carbon losses from soil organic matter and deadwood, indicating the tropical forest carbon sink "may be much smaller than previously estimated".
Researchers demonstrate an open-brain surgery-free brain implant, Stentrode, that can record brain activity from a nearby blood vessel, showing it can be used to operate a computer.
10 January
A second potentially Earth-like planet in the TOI 700 system is reported using data from NASA's Transiting Exoplanet Survey Satellite (TESS).
The long-term impact of biodiversity loss in Madagascar is modelled, suggesting that recovery from extinctions could take as long as 23 million years.
Cyclic sighing is found to be effective in reducing anxiety, negative mood and stress, and more so than mindfulness meditation.
11 January
NASA scientists report the discovery of LHS 475 b, an Earth-like exoplanet – and the first exoplanet observed by the James Webb Space Telescope.
NASA publishes images of a debris disk surrounding the red dwarf AU Mic, taken by the James Webb Space Telescope, capturing details as close to the star as 5 astronomical units (~750 million km) – the equivalent of Jupiter's orbit in the Solar System.
Teleportation of energy is demonstrated for the first time by researchers using an IBM quantum computer.
Cellular bioengineers report the development of nonreplicating bacterial 'cyborg cells' (similar to artificial cells) using a novel approach, assembling a synthetic hydrogel polymer network as an artificial cytoskeleton inside the bacteria. The cells can resist stressors that would kill natural cells and e.g. invade cancer cells or potentially act as biosensors.
The White House and federal agencies  declare the Year of Open Science, listing several actions towards open science. The science policy "Framework for Federal Scientific Integrity Policy and Practice" issued by the White House Office of Science and Technology Policy a day later is criticized as a "gag order" on scientists by PEER in an open letter (30 Jan).

12 January
Progress in life extension research:
A team led by David Sinclair shows how DNA breaks are a major driver of epigenetic change, and how the loss of epigenetic information is a cause of aging in mammals. Using a treatment based on Yamanaka factors, they demonstrate an ability to drive aging in both the forward and reverse directions in mice.
In a paywalled review, the authors of a heavily cited paper on the hallmarks of aging update the set of proposed hallmarks after a decade (3 Jan). On the same day, a review with overlapping authors merge or link various hallmarks of cancer with those of aging.
A study reports the development of deep learning software using anatomic magnetic resonance images to estimate brain age with the highest accuracy for AI so far, including detecting early signs of Alzheimer's disease and varying neuroanatomical patterns of neurological aging (3 Jan).
In a preprint, another team of researchers reports the use of reprogramming to modestly extend the lifespan in elderly mice. However, if it was also applicable to humans, risks reportedly may include the formation of cancer (5 Jan).
A study concludes that retroviruses in the human genomes can become awakened from dormant states and contribute to aging which can be blocked by neutralizing antibodies (6 Jan).
A study reports large reductions of snow cover in the Alps, emphasizing climate change adaptation needs due to their impacts on the climate and socio-economic activities.
13 January – A study of ancient DNA supports or confirms that recent human evolution to resist infection of pathogens also increased inflammatory disease risk in post-Neolithic Europeans over the last 10,000 years, estimating nature, strength, and time of onset of selections.
16 January
NASA announces preliminary considerations of several future space telescope programs, including the Great Observatory Technology Maturation Program (GOMAP), Habitable Worlds Observatory and New Great Observatories.
Researchers for the first time demonstrate redirection of lightning with lasers.
17 January
News outlets report on a study (28 Dec 22) and an interactive map by EWG using its results showing freshwater fish in the U.S. ubiquitously contain high levels of harmful PFAS, with a single serving typically significantly increasing the blood PFOS level.
Promising results of therapeutic candidates are reported:a third phase 3-trialed RSV vaccine candidate, a prebiotic fibre formula against type 2 diabetes (3 Jan), a bifunctional therapeutic and vaccine against brain cancer (4 Jan), a phase 2-trialed probiotic against S. aureus infection (13 Jan), the mice gene therapy-tested LAV-BPIFB4 protein (or this gene in gene therapy) against heart aging (13 Jan), mice-tested in-use anakinra (or blockade of its target IL-1β) against haematopoietic blood aging (17 Jan), mice-tested phase 2-scheduled IkT-148009 against Parkinson's disease (18 Jan), C. elegans-tested in-use rilmenidine as a CRM against aging (20 Jan).
18 January
News outlets report on an investigation and a set of recent studies that indicate that carbon emission reductions from projects launched to earn carbon-offset credits have been vastly overstated to the extent that ~90% of rainforest offset credits of the Verified Carbon Standard are called likely to be "phantom credits".
A metagenomic analysis provides data and insights into microbial sharing between individuals, finding substantial strain sharing among cohabiting individuals, with median strain-sharing rates for the gut and oral microbiomes being 12% (34% for mothers and their 0–3-years-old offspring) and 32% (38% for partners) in the used data. Time since cohabitation was the largest factor and bacterial strain sharing "recapitulated host population structures better than species-level profiles did".
19 January
A study using electronic health records shows  viral exposures can significantly elevate risks of neurodegenerative disease, including up to 15 years after infection.
~20 January
Progress in AI software and applications:
The AI makes use of comprehension-, recall of knowledge-, and medical reasoning-algorithms but remains inferior to clinicians. As of 2023, humans often – if not most often – conduct query-based web searches, read websites and/or conduct physical doctor's visits to inquire health information, despite various difficulties, partly as they typically did not undergo any formal training in media literacy, digital literacy or health literacy, as such is not part of schools curricula in most education systems as of 2023.
A novel potentially significantly more efficient text-to-image approach, as implemented in MUSE, is reported (2 Jan).
A first successful autonomous long-duration operation (Dec 21 and/or Dec 22), including simulated combat, of a modified F-16 fighter jet, X-62A, by two AI software is reported (4 Jan).
A text-to-speech synthesizer, VALL-E, that can be trained to mimic anybody's voice with just three seconds of voice data and may produce the most natural-sounding results to date is reported in a preprint (5 Jan).
A use of world models for a wide range of domains that makes decisions using e.g. different 3D worlds and reward frequencies and outperforms previous approaches, DreamerV3, is reported as a step towards general artificial intelligence in a preprint (10 Jan).
A large language model, ProGen, that can generate functional protein sequences with a predictable function, with the input including tags specifying protein properties, is reported (26 Jan).
A deep-learning model, ZFDesign, for zinc finger design for any genomic target for gene- and epigenetic-editing is reported (26 Jan).
Software for generating 3D dynamic scenes (text-to-4D), is reported (26 Jan).
A study reports the development of deep learning algorithms to identify technosignature candidates, finding 8 potential alien signals not detected earlier (30 Jan).
Chatbot and text-generating AI, ChatGPT (released on 30 Nov 22), a large language model, becomes highly popular, with some considering the large public's attention as unwarranted hype as potential applications are limited, similar software such as Cleverbot existed for many years, and the software is, on the fundamental level, not structured toward accuracy – e.g. providing seemingly credible but incorrect answers to queries and operating "without a contextual understanding of the language" – but only toward essentially the authenticity of mimicked human language (~Jan). It was estimated that only two months after its launch, it had 100 million active users. Applications may include solving or supporting school writing assignments, malicious social bots (e.g. for misinformation, propaganda, and scams), and providing inspiration (e.g. for artistic writing or in design or ideation in general).
23 January
The most affordable carbon capture and conversion system to date, bringing the cost down to just $39 per metric ton, is revealed.
In two studies (20 & 23 Jan), researchers report that substitution of PET adhesive tapes could  self-discharge in the widely used lithium-ion batteries, extending battery life.
A geophysical study behind a paywall reports that the spin of the Earth's inner core has stopped spinning faster than the planet's surface and likely is now rotating slower than it.
25 January
Engineers report the design of millimetre-sized robots able to rapidly shift between liquid and solid states. The devices could be used to fix electronics or remove objects from the body.
Researchers report the development of a viable wearable continuous heart ultrasound imager.
Progress in disease screening or diagnosis:researchers demonstrate the use of ants as biosensors to detect cancer via urine, in two separate studies (11 & 27 Jan) Alzheimer's disease is detected early via blood biomarkers, a non-invasive alternative to difficult rarely-used catheter testing for a common cause of high blood pressure is reported (16 Jan).
27 January
A study finds that the world has enough rare earths and other raw materials to switch from fossil fuels to renewable energy.
ESA reports the successful demonstration of a breaking sail-based satellite deorbiter, which could be used by space debris mitigation measures.
30 January
Climate scientists predict, using artificial intelligence, that global warming will exceed 1.5°C  (scenario SSP2-4.5), and a nearly 70% chance of 2°C between 2044 and 2065 (~2054) – a substantial probability of exceeding the 2°C threshold – even if emissions rapidly decline (scenario SSP1-2.6).
In two paywalled studies (4 & 30 Jan) separate teams of researchers report substantial improvements to green hydrogen production methods, enabling higher efficiencies and durable use of untreated seawater.
31 January – A news outlet reports on a study (9 Nov 22) that concludes that a "visual flicker paradigm to entrain individuals at their own brain rhythm (i.e. peak alpha frequency)" results in  faster perceptual visual learning, maintained the day following training.

February

1 February 
C/2022 E3 (ZTF), a green-coloured comet from the Oort cloud, is observed in the night sky making its closest approach to Earth.
An article in the journal Leonardo examines Leonardo da Vinci's experiments on gravity in the Codex Arundel and presents a solution using Newtonian mechanics to confirm Leonardo’s "equivalence principle".
6 February – Astronomers announce the discovery of an additional 12 moons of Jupiter.
8 February
The minor planet Quaoar is found to have a ring system, following observations by the CHEOPS space telescope.
Scientists in the U.S. propose mining the lunar soil and launching it towards the Sun to form a shield against the effects of global warming.
The first direct transfer of qubits between quantum computer microchips is demonstrated, with a 99.999993% accuracy rate and connection speed of 2424/s. The research team, from the University of Sussex, suggests their work has "the potential to scale-up by connecting hundreds or even thousands of quantum computing microchips."

13 February – A previously unknown cell mechanism involved in aging is discovered, which explains how cells 'remember' their identity when they divide – the cells' so-called epigenetic memory.
14 February – A new record low Antarctic sea ice extent is reported by the National Snow and Ice Data Center in the US, beating the previous record set a year earlier.
15 February
A joint study by the British Antarctic Survey and the US Antarctic programme finds that glaciers on the icy continent may be more sensitive to changes in sea temperature than previously thought. Researchers used sensors and an underwater robot beneath the Thwaites glacier to study melting.
Scientists report that the possible sounds that ankylosaur dinosaurs may have made were bird-like vocalizations based on a finding of a fossilized larynx from the ankylosaur Pinacosaurus grangeri.
16 February – An effective new method for carbon dioxide removal from the ocean is described by MIT researchers. It could be implemented by ships that would process seawater as they travel, or at offshore drilling platforms or aquaculture fish farms.
17 February – The engineering of metastructures at the sub-wavelength scale is shown to be a viable approach for developing ultra-fast electronics in 6G communications.
21 February – Scientists report the findings of a "dark microbiome" of microorganisms in the Atacama Desert in Chile, a Mars-like region on Earth.
22 February – Soft, 3D-printed heart replicas that can be personalised for individual patients are demonstrated by engineers at MIT.
23 February
The world's first COVID-19 drug designed entirely by generative AI is approved for human use, with clinical trials expected to begin in China. The new drug, ISM3312, is developed by Insilico Medicine.
The growing of electrodes in the living tissue of zebrafish and medicinal leeches is demonstrated at Linköping University, using an injectable gel and the animals' own endogenous molecules to trigger the formation. The researchers claim their breakthrough enables "a new paradigm in bioelectronics."
27 February – The channelling of ions into defined pathways in perovskite materials is shown to improve the stability and operational performance of perovskite solar cells. A research team at North Carolina State University claims this could boost their efficiency from 25 to 40%.

March

1 March – A new record for the closest and oldest ultracool dwarf binary pair is reported. The newly discovered stars, in a system named LP 413-53AB, orbit each other in just 17 hours and are believed to be billions of years old.
7 March – Google reveals PaLM-E, an embodied multimodal language model with 562 billion parameters.
8 March
A new way of capturing carbon, which transforms the gas into bicarbonate of soda and stores it safely in seawater, is shown to be three times more efficient than existing methods.
Nitrogen-doped lutetium hydride is demonstrated as a viable superconducting material at 20 °C (room temperature) under a pressure of 1 GPa (10 kbar).
10 March – The entire brain of a fruit fly larva is mapped in complete detail for the first time, showing all 3,016 neurons and 548,000 synapses.
14 March
 Medical researchers report a 24% reduction of heart disease risk in women on a Mediterranean-type diet.
GPT-4 is launched.
15 March
Insect-sized robots that include self-repair techniques in the case of wing damage are demonstrated by engineers at MIT.
The first clear evidence of active volcanism on Venus is presented, based on a reanalysis of old images from the Magellan spacecraft.

Predicted and scheduled events

 Science policy
In January, the US NIH will begin "requiring most of the 300,000 researchers and 2,500 institutions it funds annually to include a data-management plan in their grant applications — and to eventually make their data publicly available". Advantages of such requirements may include making science more accessible, increasing public trust in science and increasing efficiency and reproducibility.
 Search for extraterrestrial intelligence (SETI) and ufology
 First major observational campaign of the SETI project .
 Expected public release date of the first study by NASA on UAP in mid-2023.
 Expected public first release of results from the international UFO investigation project The Galileo Project led by astronomer Avi Loeb.
Rocket Lab's Venus probe is scheduled to be launched and to arrive on Venus in October, partly to search for signs of life on Venus.
 Expected start of the Vera Rubin Observatory, the Qitai Radio Telescope, the European Spallation Source and the Jiangmen Underground Neutrino Observatory.
 Nature has listed 11 clinical trials to watch in 2023. Results of the Participatory Evaluation (of) Aging (With) Rapamycin (for) Longevity Study (PEARL) clinical trial investigating a life extension intervention are expected to be released.
 Science-related budgets
 : several fields, research topics and agencies are provided with increased budgets, including the new Advanced Research Projects Agency for Health (ARPA-H). Various changes to the budgets of US institutions like NASA, FDA, EPA and NIH have been described.
 :

Astronomical events

Awards

Deaths

See also

 :Category:Science events
 :Category:Science timelines
 List of emerging technologies
 List of years in science

References

External links

 
21st century in science
2020s in technology
2023-related lists

Science timelines by year

de:2023 in der Wissenschaft und Technik